P.J. Whelihan's Pub + Restaurant is a chain of sports bars based in Haddon Township, New Jersey. As of March 2020, the chain operates 19 locations in New Jersey and Pennsylvania. The chain has been owned by the P.J.W. Restaurant Group since the companies inception in 1983.

History
Platzer and his wife opened Platz's in 1983 in Lehighton, Pennsylvania. When Platzer opened his second restaurant in Allentown in 1993, he changed the name to P.J. Whelihan's Pub + Restaurant to honor his grandfather, Peter Joseph Whelihan.

References

External links

1982 establishments in Ohio
American companies established in 1983
Restaurant chains in the United States
Companies based in Camden County, New Jersey
Companies formerly listed on the Nasdaq
Restaurants established in 1983
Haddon Township, New Jersey